Satsuma is an unincorporated community in Putnam County, Florida, United States. Its ZIP code is 32189, and the main road through the community is U.S. Route 17.

Satsuma is the home of the Putnam County Speedway.

Notes

Unincorporated communities in Putnam County, Florida
Unincorporated communities in Florida
Populated places on the St. Johns River